The following is a list of social nudity organizations associated with naturism and nude recreation within a family-friendly, non-sexualized context.

Major naturist organizations

Worldwide
 International Naturist Federation (INF) with regional member organizations in 34 countries.

North America

United States
 The American Association for Nude Recreation (AANR) Main national nudist organization
 American Nudist Research Library
 The Naturist Society (TNS) Main national naturist organization
 Tennessee's Associated Naturists Network (TANN)
 Florida Young Naturists
 Black Naturists Association (BNA)
 Western Nudist Research Library (WNRL)

Canada
 Federation of Canadian Naturists (FCN)
 FQN-FCN Union (Canada's official representative in the INF)
 La Fédération Québécoise de Naturisme (FQN)

Europe

France
 Association pour la promotion du naturisme en liberté  (APNEL)

Germany

 Deutscher Verband für Freikörperkultur

The Netherlands
 Naturisten Federatie Nederland (NFN)

Spain
 Federación Española de Naturismo (FEN)
 Asociación Naturista Nudista de Andalucía (ANNA)
 Asociación para el Desarrollo del Naturismo de la Comunidad de Madrid (ADN)
 Asociación Naturista de Tenerife (NATURATEN)
 Asociación Naturista de Galicia (NaturiGal) 
 Associació Club Català de Naturisme (CCN)

United Kingdom
 British Naturism – National organization formerly known as CCBN (Central Council for British Naturism)
 Naturist Action Group

Asia
 Naturist Association Thailand, the national naturist organization in Thailand.

Australia

 The Queensland Naturist Association

Topfree organizations

 Topfree Equal Rights Association (TERA)
Outdoor Co-ed Topless Pulp Fiction Appreciation Society
 Go Topless Day
 Free the Nipple

References

External links
 Where to be Naked in the World
 Naked For Peace

 
Lists of organizations